Kahak may refer to:
Kahak-e Esfij, a village in Kerman Province
Kahak-e Fathabad, a village in Kerman Province
Kahak-e Zardasht, a village in Kerman Province
Kahak, Delijan, a village in Markazi Province (birthplace of Aga Khan I)
Kahak, Saveh, a village in Markazi Province
Kahak, Qazvin, a village in Qazvin Province
Kahak, Qom, a city in Qom Province
Kahak, Razavi Khorasan, a village in Sabzevar County, Razavi Khorasan Province (birthplace of Ali Shariati)
Kahak, Semnan, a village in Semnan Province
Kahak, South Khorasan, a village in South Khorasan Province
Kahak District, an administrative subdivision of Qom Province
Kahak Rural District, an administrative subdivision of Qom Province

See also
 Kohak (disambiguation)